Inside Out, earlier known as Roleplay, was an American musical which tells a story of a six-person support group. It was  co-written by Adryan Russ and Doug Haverty.

Production history
Premiered in 1989, as Roleplay  at the Group Repertory Theatre in Los Angeles, after a number of out-of town productions, in 1994 it opened off-Broadway at the Cherry Lane Theatre, New York City.  Its 1998 production at the Laguna Playhouse in Laguna Beach, California, it garnered its authors the Robby Award. In 2000, 12 Miles West Theatre Company in Montclair NJ produced this musical and won the Star Ledger award for best play.  Directed by Lenny Bart, starring Mona Hennessy, Tricia Burr, and others.

Characters
Grace - the therapist
Molly - a recent mother whose husband has lost sexual interest in her, she is suffering from a growing case of anorexia 
Liz - "a high-powered businesswoman with children, is on a collision course with her house-husband mate, who demands more of her time"
Sage - a self-destructive character in regards to her love life and very dependent on astrology tarot cards, etc...to show her fate
Chlo - "an unattached lesbian mother whose teen-age son has begun rebelling against her excessive devotion"
Dena - an insecure pop singer who has had an 11-year rough patch in her career

Song List 
 1 Inside Out
 2 Let It Go
 3 Thin
 4 I Can See You Here
 5 If You Really Loved Me
 6 Yo, Chlo
 7 If You Really Loved Me (Reprise)
 8 Behind Dena's Back
 9 No One Inside
 10 Inside Out (Reprise) 
 11 Grace's Nightmare
 12 All I Do Is Sing
 13 Never Enough
 14 I Don't Say Anything
 15 The Passing Of A Friend
 16 Things Look Different
 17 Do It At Home
 18 Reaching Up

References

Off-Broadway musicals
1992 musicals